Eugene Kashper is an American beer entrepreneur and Chairman of Blue Ribbon Partners. He also served as the Chairman and CEO of Pabst Brewing Company.

Biography
Kashper was born in the Soviet Union to Jewish parents; he has told Russian interviewers he was born in Leningrad in 1969. He and his family immigrated to the United States as political refugees when he was six years old, and he became an American citizen shortly after. He grew up in Arizona and New Jersey, and after high school attended Columbia University, graduating in 1992 with a degree in East Asian Studies. 

He then went to work for Ernst & Young, which quickly capitalized on his language skills by sending him to Moscow. Soon after that move, he left Ernst & Young and moved into the beer industry. 

He began his beer industry career in 1994 by importing Stroh beer from The Stroh Brewery Company of Detroit, Michigan into Russia. After the Russian government started imposing taxes on imported beer, he founded the Pivovarni Ivana Taranova (PIT) brewery with plants in Khabarovsk, Novotroitsk, and Kaliningrad. In just a few years the company had become the biggest independent producer of beer before its founders sold it to Heineken in 2005 – only to start all over again just outside the Russian capital with an even bigger, even more modern enterprise in 2006 - Moscow Brewing Company. 

He later co-founded Oasis Beverages and served as its chairman from 2008 to 2014. In press releases from September 2014, Oasis Beverages was mentioned as the buyer for the Pabst Blue Ribbon brand. The headquarters for Oasis was an address on Cyprus - a known tax-haven used by Russian oligarchs.

Under Kashper, Pabst announced on November 13, 2014, that it had completed its sale to Blue Ribbon Intermediate Holdings, LLC. Blue Ribbon is a partnership between Kashper and TSG Consumer Partners, a San Francisco–based private equity firm.
"We are thrilled to complete the acquisition of this great company," said Kashper, who said he would relocate with his family from New York to Los Angeles.

References 

Living people
American chief executives of food industry companies
American people of Russian-Jewish descent
Year of birth missing (living people)
Columbia College (New York) alumni
Ernst & Young people
Pabst Brewing Company
Businesspeople from Saint Petersburg
Russian businesspeople in the United States